Udara cyma is a butterfly in the family Lycaenidae. It was described by Lambertus Johannes Toxopeus in 1927. It is found in the Indomalayan realm.

Subspecies
Udara cyma cyma (southern Burma, Thailand, Malay Peninsula, Borneo, Sumatra)
Udara cyma elioti Hayashi, 1976 (Palawan)

References

External links
Udara at Markku Savela's Lepidoptera and Some Other Life Forms

Udara
Butterflies described in 1927
Taxa named by Lambertus Johannes Toxopeus